The 1933 NCAA Wrestling Championships were the 6th NCAA Wrestling Championships to be held. Lehigh in Bethlehem, Pennsylvania hosted the tournament at Taylor Gymnasium.

There were no official team ratings, however, with three champions each Iowa Agricultural College and Oklahoma A&M are cited as unofficial co-champions.

Alan Kelley of Oklahoma A&M was awarded the Outstanding Wrestler trophy. Pat Johnson of Harvard, who took third place, received an award for being runner-up in the OW voting.

Individual finals

Source

References

NCAA Division I Wrestling Championship
Wrestling competitions in the United States
1933 in American sports
NCAA Wrestling